Drês is the sixth album released by Brazilian band Nando Reis e os Infernais. The singer Ana Cañas guest appeared on the track "Pra Você Guardei o Amor". The song "Ainda Não Passou" nominated for the 2009 Latin Grammy Award of Best Brazilian Song (Portuguese Language). As of August 2010, the album sold around 18,000 copies.

The name of the album is a portmanteau of the words "Dri" (nickname of his ex-girlfriend
Adriana Lotaif) and "três" (three, the number of songs dedicated to her in the album: "Hi, Dri!", "Driamante" and the title-track).

Track listing 
 "Hi Dri" 
 "Ainda Não Passou" (It Still Didn't Pass) - 3:16
 "Drês" - 4:16
 "Conta" (Account) - 4:42
 "Só Pra So" (Only for So) - 3:25
 "Mosaico Abstrato" (Abstract Mosaic) - 4:38
 "Pra Você Guardei o Amor" (For You I Kept Love) (featuring Ana Cañas) - 5:43
 "Livre Como um Deus" (Free as a God) - 5:11
 "Driamante" (Driamond) - 2:39
 "Hoje Eu te Pedi em Casamento" (Today I Proposed to You) - 3:19
 "Mil Galáxias" (A Thousand Galaxies) - 3:33
 "Baby, Eu Queria" (Baby, I Wanted to) - 3:00

Personnel 
Nando Reis – Lead vocals, acoustic guitar
Carlos Pontual – Electric guitar
Alex Veley – Keyboards
Felipe Cambraia – Bass guitar
Diogo Gameiro – drums

References

External links 
 

2009 albums
Nando Reis e os Infernais albums